The New York Marble Cemetery is a burial ground established in 1830 in what is now the East Village of Manhattan. It occupies the interior of the block bounded by 2nd Street, Second Avenue, 3rd Street, and the Bowery. It is entered through an alleyway with an iron gate at each end, located between 41 and 43 Second Avenue. About 2,100 burials are recorded in the cemetery's written registers, most from prominent professional and merchant families in New York City.

The New York Marble Cemetery, which was New York City's first non-sectarian burial place, should not be confused with the nearby New York City Marble Cemetery one block east, which is entirely separate, and was established one year later.  Both cemeteries were designated New York City landmarks in 1969, and in 1980 both were added to the National Register of Historic Places.

History and description

The cemetery was founded as a commercial undertaking of Perkins Nichols, who hired two lawyers, Anthony Dey and George W. Strong, to serve as organizing trustees. Recent outbreaks of yellow fever led city residents to fear burying their dead in coffins just a few feet below ground, and public health legislation had outlawed earthen burials.  Nichols intended to appeal to this market by providing underground vaults for burial.

Dey and Strong purchased the property on Nichols's behalf, on what was then the northern edge of residential development, on July 13, 1830, and Nichols had the 156 underground family vaults, each the size of a small room, constructed from Tuckahoe marble and laid out in a grid of six columns by 26 rows.  He was then reimbursed from the sale of the vaults.

Access to each pair of barrel vaults is by the removal of a stone slab set well below the grade of the lawn, which has no monuments or markers. Marble tablets mounted in the long north and south walls give the names of the original vault owners – though not the names of burials – and indicate the precise location of each corresponding underground vault. By 1997, parts of the North Wall had collapsed and other portions required steel buttresses.  The weakened sections were dismantled and rebuilt to an eight-foot height and the buttresses removed as of November, 2018.

Nichols, Dey & Strong, and the subscribers applied to the New York State Legislature for a special act of incorporation, and this was granted on February 4, 1831.  According to a historical plaque on the cemetery's entrance gate "Descendants of the 19th century owners may still be buried here."

Visiting
According to the cemetery's website, it is usually open on the fourth Sunday of the month from April to October, as well as on other weekends during the year.  The Cemetery grounds are available for rental for appropriate events.

Notable burials
 Gurdon Buck, pioneer plastic surgeon
 Captain William Henry Chester, Union Army Officer, mortally wounded at the battle of Gettysburg
 Aaron Clark, Whig mayor of New York City from 1837 to 1839
 Theodore Gordon, angler and sage of the Neversink River
 John Wheeler Leavitt, prominent merchant, grandfather of artist Cecilia Beaux
 Pierre Lorillard II, tobacco tycoon
 Stevens T. Mason, first governor of Michigan, later reinterred in Capitol Park, Detroit
 David Olyphant, a merchant involved in trade with China
 Luman Reed American art patron
 Uriah Scribner, merchant, and Charles Scribner, publisher, later reinterred at Woodlawn 
 James Tallmadge Jr., Congressman (1817–19) and New York University Council President
 Benjamin Wright, Chief Engineer for the Erie Canal

Prominent New York uppertens families such as the Beeckmans, Hones, Hoyts, Quackenbushes, Varicks and Van Zandts have vaults in the cemetery.

References 
Notes

Further reading

External links

 Official website
 
 Forgotten NY
 New York Marble Cemetery Records at the New York Historical Society 

Cemeteries on the National Register of Historic Places in Manhattan
Cemeteries in Manhattan
New York City Designated Landmarks in Manhattan
1830 establishments in New York (state)
East Village, Manhattan
Cemeteries established in the 1830s